Aisling O'Leary (born 7 July 1957) is an Irish former swimmer. She competed in three events at the 1972 Summer Olympics.

References

External links
 

1957 births
Living people
Irish female swimmers
Olympic swimmers of Ireland
Swimmers at the 1972 Summer Olympics
Place of birth missing (living people)